Artyom Andreyevich Alimov (born 7 April 1986) is a former Russian professional football player.

Club career
He made his debut for FC Kuban Krasnodar on 2 July 2006 in a Russian Cup game against PFC Krylia Sovetov Samara.

External links
 
 

1986 births
Living people
Russian footballers
Association football midfielders
FC Kuban Krasnodar players
FC Volgar Astrakhan players